The Hungary national rugby union team is governed by the Hungarian Rugby Union. They have yet to qualify for the Rugby World Cup, although they have entered qualifiers for all the tournaments from the 1995 edition onwards. They compete annually in the European Nations Cup, currently in Division 2C.

The national side is ranked 68th in the world (as of 29 July 2019).

History
Hungary played their first official match against East Germany in Érd in 1990, losing 3–7, but they played a number of unofficial matches prior to this, mainly against a likewise unofficial Austrian team, including a match in Győr on 1 May 1983.

Hungary first entered the qualifiers for the 1995 World Cup in 1993, being at the wrong end of an 8–67 scoreline against Israel.
Things went better in the 1999 qualifying rounds, where they beat Lithuania and Luxembourg, but lost to Andorra and Sweden.

In the 2003 qualifiers, they won against Andorra and Bulgaria, but lost to Bosnia, Yugoslavia (as Serbia was then still known), and Switzerland.
The 2007 qualifying was their worst performance to date, losing all four matches played, including a 9–63 thumping by Spain.

Current squad
Squad to 2014 European Nations Cup – Division 2D.

Zoltan Heckel (C)
Gabor Biró
Roland Nagy
Dan Toth
Attila Jambor
Zoltan Koller
Gabor Bartus
Mate Toth
Attila Refi
Gergo Ban
Gareth Lloyd
Gregoire Collet
Achilles Gyurcsik
Tibor Krisko
Attila Prakter
Szabolcs Nagyhegyesi
Jung Szilárd
Viktor Madarasz
Szabolcs Pocskai
Karoly Suiogan
Janos Csniernik
Daniel Gelecsak
Laszlo Teisenhoffer
Jonathan Katona
Gabor Kendi

Strip
The badge on the shirt derives from the Csodaszarvas, a mythological stag that led the ancient Hungarian people to the Pannonian Basin.

In the Austria match of 1983, they played in presumably white jerseys with either a black or dark green hoop, black shorts, and either black or dark green socks with white tops. After the MRgSz was established, the team reverted to the flag colors of red, white, and green, with the current strip consisting of red shirts and shorts and green socks.

Grounds
Hungary plays its home games at the Budapest Rugby Center in Kincsem Park. Most games, before the new stadium was built in 2019, used to be held in Esztergom.

Record

See also
 Rugby union in Hungary
 Hungary national rugby sevens team

References

External links
 Magyar Rögbi Szövetség
 Hungary at RugbyData.com – Statistics and results
 Hungary's rugbyhistory in photos and scanned documents from the beginnings in 1968. A continuously expanding archive in chronological order. It is mostly in Hungarian, still easy to follow the relevant events – including the national side games.

European national rugby union teams
Rugby union in Hungary
Teams in European Nations Cup (rugby union)
Rugby